Lewis Christopher Mark McKinney is an English professional footballer who plays as a midfielder for Salford City's Under-23 development team.

Career
McKinney played for Burnley's youth teams before joining Oldham Athletic for the start of the 2017–18 season, signing two-year scholarship forms to join the club's youth team from the 2018-19 season. He made his first-team debut as a 69th-minute substitute for Mohamed Maouche in a 1–0 defeat to Macclesfield Town at Boundary Park on 19 October 2019. In November 2019, he joined Runcorn Linnets on a month's work experience loan.

At the end of the 2019–20 season he was not offered a professional contract by the club and released.

After his release from Oldham, he played for Salford City's under-23 development team in the 2020–21 season.

Career statistics

References

Living people
English footballers
Association football midfielders
Oldham Athletic A.F.C. players
English Football League players
Northern Premier League players
Runcorn Linnets F.C. players
Year of birth missing (living people)
Salford City F.C. players